The 1996 UEFA European Under-16 Championship was the 14th edition of UEFA's European Under-16 Football Championship. Austria hosted the championship, during 29 April – 11 May 1996. 16 teams entered the competition, and Portugal defeated France in the final to win the competition for the third time. Portugal was the first team to win the title two years in a row (Spain did it again in 2007 and 2008).

Squads

Participants

Group stage

Group A

Group B

Group C

Group D

Knockout stages

Bracket

Quarterfinals

Semifinals

Third Place Playoff

Final

References
RSSSF.com
UEFA.com

1996
UEFA
1996 in Austrian sport
1996
April 1996 sports events in Europe
May 1996 sports events in Europe
1996 in youth association football